This is a list of lighthouses in Scotland. The Northern Lighthouse Board, from which much of the  information is derived, are responsible for most lighthouses in Scotland but have handed over responsibility in the major estuaries to the port authorities. Many of the more minor lights are not shown. A lighthouse that is no longer operating is indicated by the date of closure in the operated by column. Where two dates are shown, the lighthouse has been rebuilt.

Nearly all the lighthouses in this list were designed by and most were built by four generations of one family, including Thomas Smith, who was both the stepfather and father-in-law of Robert Stevenson. Robert's sons and grandsons not only built most of the lights, often under the most appalling of conditions, but pioneered many of the improvements in lighting and signalling that cut down the enormous loss of life in shipping around the coasts of Scotland.

The table may be sorted by any column by clicking on the heading.


Lighthouses

See also
Alan Stevenson, David Stevenson, Robert Stevenson (civil engineer), Robert Louis Stevenson
Trinity House of Leith
List of lighthouses and lightvessels
Lightvessel
Lighthouses in England
Lighthouses in Ireland
Lighthouses in Wales
List of Northern Lighthouse Board lighthouses

Notes

References

Further reading

 

 
Scotland
Lighthouses
Lighthouses